Hard to Wet, Easy to Dry is the eighth studio album by Jamaican dancehall recording artist Mad Cobra; released August 25, 1992 via Columbia Records. It is his only album to date to appear on the Billboard 200, peaking at #125 on the chart in 1992. The album also charted at #17 on the Billboard R&B chart in 1992.

Four singles were released from Hard to Wet, Easy to Dry: "Flex",  "Dead End Street", "Legacy" and "Mate a Talk". "Flex" was the most successful single from the album, peaking at #13 on the Billboard Hot 100 in 1992.

Track listing

Chart positions

References

External links
 
 

1992 albums
Albums produced by Sly Dunbar
Columbia Records albums
Mad Cobra albums